The All Japan Federation of Metal Miners' Unions (Zenko) was a trade union representing ore miners in Japan.

The union was founded in 1947, and it later affiliated to the General Council of Trade Unions of Japan.  By 1958, it had 57,000 members, although membership fell to 31,984 by 1970, and only 10,290 in 1980, in line with a decline in employment in the industry.  In 1982, it merged into the new All Japan Federation of Non-Ferrous Metal Workers' Unions.

References

Mining trade unions
Trade unions established in 1947
Trade unions disestablished in 1982
Trade unions in Japan